The Cumero Fire was a wildfire that burned  in Pima County, Arizona, and Sonora, Mexico. The fire was detected on July 5, 2018, burning in the Coronado National Forest near the Mexico–United States border. The fire was contained on July 8 and continued to burn until July 10. No structures were destroyed or damaged by the Cumero Fire, for was a cause for the fire determined.

Fire
On July 5, 2018, smoke was spotted rising from Mount Cumero, near Sasabe, Arizona, near the Mexico–United States border and within the Coronado National Forest. By 6:00 PM (Mountain Time), three firecrews supported by five helicopters were on scene attempting suppression of the Cumero Fire. By the next day, the fire had grown to —within the United States and Mexico—but firefighters made progress in suppressing the fire, estimating its spread to be 40% contained. The fire continued to burn in containment until July 10.

Aftermath
The Cumero Fire burned  over five days in the United States and Mexico and cost $500,000 to suppress. No structures were destroyed or damaged.

No cause for the fire was determined.

References

Coronado National Forest
July 2018 events in the United States
2018 Arizona wildfires
History of Pima County, Arizona